"Being a Girl" (or "Being a Girl (Part One)") is a song by the English alternative rock band Mansun. The song was written by band-leader Paul Draper. It was recorded and produced by Paul Draper and Mark 'Spike' Stent with additional production by Mike Hunter during sessions for the group's second studio album. The song was reduced to its opening two minutes and released as the second single in 1998 from the group's second album, Six. The song's pop-punk sound was a departure from the group's recent hits and went on to become their seventh consecutive top UK top twenty hit peaking at #13. Part Two's experimental rock sound is more representative of the parent album as a whole.

Track listing

Personnel

Mansun
 Dominic Chad – Lead Guitar, Backing Vocals
 Paul Draper – Lead Vocals, Rhythm Guitar
 Andie Rathbone – Drums
 Stove – Bass
 Howard Devoto - Vocals ("Railings")

Production
Paul Draper and Mark 'Spike' Stent – producer
Mike Hunter – engineer, additional production
Paul Walton – engineer
Jan Kybeert – Pro Tools
Pete Nevin - Illustration

Chart positions

References

1998 singles
Mansun songs
Songs written by Paul Draper (musician)
1998 songs
Song recordings produced by Spike Stent
Parlophone singles